Limenitis is a genus of brush-footed butterflies, commonly called the admirals. The sister butterflies (Adelpha) and commander butterflies (Moduza) are sometimes included here.

The name Limenitis is New Latin "of harbours", from Ancient Greek Λιμενιτις (from λιμήν, a harbour, haven).

Species
Listed alphabetically within groups:

Species group Basilarchia (North America):

Species group helmanni (eastern Asia):

Unnamed species group (South-East Asia):

Ungrouped species (Asia and Europe):

References

Further reading
 Glassberg, Jeffrey Butterflies through Binoculars: The West (2001)
 Guppy, Crispin S. and Shepard, Jon H. Butterflies of British Columbia (2001)
 James, David G. and Nunnallee, David Life Histories of Cascadia Butterflies (2011)
 Pelham, Jonathan Catalogue of the Butterflies of the United States and Canada (2008)
 Pyle, Robert Michael The Butterflies of Cascadia (2002)

External links

Checklist of Nearctic Nymphalidae
 Butterflies and Moths of North America
 Butterflies of America
Images representing Limenitis at EOL
Images representing Limenitis at Bold

 
Nymphalidae genera
Taxa named by Johan Christian Fabricius
Limenitidinae